False documentation is the process of creating documents which record fictitious events.  The documents can then be used to "prove" that the fictional events happened.  A common propaganda tool, false documentation is often used by management groups and totalitarian governments for four basic reasons:
 to have a basis for accusations against groups or individuals who oppose those in authority,
 to invoke hatred against certain racial, ethnic or religious groups (appeal to bigotry),
 To support the actions of those in power (appeal to patriotism), and
 To cover the mistakes of those in power (deniability).

Perhaps the best illustration of false documentation is Nazi Germany, where the authorities falsified documents for all four reasons.

There are three basic methods for falsifying documentation.  One way, of course, is to create an entirely fictional event and write it down.  The other is to misrepresent an actual incident by embellishment or exaggeration so that the blame for the incident is misplaced.  The third is to refuse to document an actual event, thereby exonerating the instigators for lack of proof.

The practice of false documentation rests on the fallacy, promoted by management organizations and governments, that whatever has been written down is unquestionably true.  In business, it rests on a further bias: the tendency of management to believe managers rather than to collect and objectively judge evidence.  As folklorist Jan Harold Brunvand points out, when a story or a claim appears in print, it gains an air of authority.  Many people are skeptical of spoken rumors, but few doubt the veracity of stories appearing in the news media.

A related fallacy is, of course, that whatever has not been documented must not have happened. Although absence of evidence is evidence of absence, whether any given event happened is entirely independent of whether it was documented.

In George Orwell's novel 1984, the Ministry of Truth has an entire department devoted to altering past editions of newspapers in the belief that changing documentation will change the public's perception of history.  One of the novel's greatest ironies is that the Ministry of Truth deals exclusively in lies.